Dehnow (also Romanized as Deh-i-Nau and Deh Now; also known as Khvorīneh Bāqer) is a village in Kheybar Rural District, Choghamish District, Dezful County, Khuzestan Province, Iran. At the 2006 census, its population was 666, in 137 families.

References 

Populated places in Dezful County